This is a list of birds found in the Pakistani city of Islamabad. The Margalla Hills and Rawal Lake are notable bird watching locations.

Little grebe, Tachybaptus ruficollis
Little cormorant, Microcarbo niger 
Great cormorant, Phalacrocorax carbo
Black-crowned night heron, Nycticorax nycticorax
Indian pond heron (paddybird), Ardeola grayii 
Cattle egret, Bubulcus ibis 
Little egret, Egretta garzetta
Intermediate egret, Egretta intermedia
Grey heron, Ardea cinerea 
Purple heron, Ardea purpurea 
Common teal, Anas crecca 
Black kite, Milvus migrans 
Shikra, Accipiter badius 
Long-legged buzzard, Buteo rufinus
Eurasian kestrel, Falco tinnunculus 
Grey francolin, Francolinus pondicerianus 
Common quail, Coturnix coturnix 
Brown waterhen, Amaurornis akool
White-breasted waterhen, Amaurornis phoenicurus 
Moorhen, Gallinula chloropus
Eurasian coot, Fulica atra 
Red-wattled lapwing, Hoplopterus indicus 
Common sandpiper, Actitis hypoleucos 
Black-headed gull, Larus ridibundus
Feral pigeon, Columba livia
Wood pigeon, Columba palumbus 
Collared dove, Streptopelia decaocto
Palm dove, Spilopelia senegalensis
Spotted dove, Spilopelia chinensis 
Rose-ringed parakeet, Psittacula krameri
Common koel, Eudynamys scolopacea
Greater coucal, Centropus sinensis 
House swift, Apus affinis
White-throated kingfisher, Halcyon smyrnensis
Pied kingfisher, Ceryle rudis 
Hoopoe, Upupa epops 
Lesser golden-backed woodpecker, Dinopium benghalense 
Brown-fronted woodpecker, Dendrocopos auriceps
Crested lark, Galerida cristata 
Small skylark, Alauda gulgula 
Brown-throated sand martin, Riparia paludicola
Pale sand martin, Riparia diluta 
Barn swallow, Hirundo rustica
Red-rumped swallow, Hirundo daurica
Paddyfield pipit, Anthus rufulus 
Grey wagtail, Motacilla cinerea
White wagtail, Motacilla alba 
Large pied wagtail, Motacilla maderaspatensis 
Himalayan bulbul, Pycnonotus leucogenys 
Red-vented bulbul, Pycnonotus cafer
Dark-grey bushchat, Saxicola ferrea
Blue rock thrush, Monticola solitarius 
Blue whistling thrush, Myophonus caeruleus
Fan-tailed warbler, Cisticola juncidis 
Tawny prinia, Prinia inornata 
Yellow-bellied prinia, Prinia flaviventris 
Hume's leaf warbler, Phylloscopus humei 
White-throated fantail, Rhipidura albicollis 
Black-chinned babbler, Stachyris pyrrhops 
Common babbler, Turdoides caudatus 
Jungle babbler, Turdoides striatus
Great tit, Parus major 
Bar-tailed treecreeper, Certhia himalayana
Oriental white-eye, Zosterops palpebrosus 
Rufous-backed shrike, Lanius schach 
Black drongo, Dicrurus macrocercus
House crow, Corvus splendens 
Brahminy starling, Sturnus pagodarum 
Common myna, Acridotheres tristis
Bank myna, Acridotheres ginginianus
House sparrow, Passer domesticus
Alexandrine parakeet, Psittacula eupatria
Green bee-eater, Merops orientalis
Rufous treepie, Dendrocitta vagabunda
Indian robin, Saxicoloides fulicatus
Common greenshank, Tringa nebularia
Marsh sandpiper, Tringa stagnatilis
Grey treepie, Dendrocitta formosae
Eurasian sparrowhawk, Accipiter nisus
Verditer flycatcher, Eumyias thalassinus
Paradise flycatcher, Terpsiphone paradisi
Blue rock thrush, Monticola solitarius
Blue whistling thrush, Myophonus caeruleus
Orange headed thrush, Geokichla citrina
Chestnut thrush, Turdus rubrocanus
Crested kingfisher, Megaceryle lugubris
Black headed jay, Garrulus lanceolatus
Brown crake, Zapornia akool

References
Islamabad Bird Report

birds
'